Presented by Neil Oliver, A History of Scotland is a television series first broadcast in November 2008 on BBC One Scotland and later shown UK-wide on BBC Two during January 2009. The second series began on BBC One Scotland in early November 2009, with transmission at a later point on network BBC Two. In Australia, series one aired on SBS One Sundays at 7:30pm from 6 December 2009 to 3 January 2010. Series two commenced on 24 October 2010 running until 21 November 2010.

Along with the series, BBC Scotland planned a range of radio programs, a new website, an interactive game, and concerts. The Open University, in collaboration with the BBC, also created a series of audio walks around historic locations in Scotland, with narration from Oliver.

Episodes
Episodes are 60 minutes in length, with the following information sourced from the BBC website.

Series 1

Series 2

Reception
Despite being hailed by BBC Scotland as "one of its most ambitious projects ever", the show has not been without controversy. There have been some claims, on the website of the BBC, that the programme made some errors. Further, the 10-part series has come under fire over claims that it is too "anglocentric".

References

External links
 
 "A History of Scotland"  at IMDb
 A History of Scotland at BBC Online

2008 Scottish television series debuts
BBC Scotland television shows
2010 Scottish television series endings
Television series about the history of Scotland
BBC television documentaries about prehistoric and ancient history
BBC television documentaries about medieval history
BBC television documentaries about history during the 16th and 17th centuries
BBC television documentaries about history during the 18th and 19th centuries
BBC television documentaries about history during the 20th Century